Morrison Baptist Church is a historic Baptist church in Morrison, Oklahoma.

It was built in 1903 and added to the National Register of Historic Places in 1984.

References

Baptist churches in Oklahoma
Churches on the National Register of Historic Places in Oklahoma
Carpenter Gothic church buildings in Oklahoma
Churches completed in 1903
Buildings and structures in Noble County, Oklahoma
National Register of Historic Places in Noble County, Oklahoma